is a city located in Nagano Prefecture, Japan. Matsumoto is designated as a core city since 1 April 2021. , the city had a population of 239,466 in 105,207 households and a population density of 240 persons per km2.

Geography
Matsumoto is located in the Matsumoto Basin of central Nagano Prefecture surrounded by mountains and is acclaimed for its beautiful views. It is approximately 75 kilometers south of the prefectural capital at Nagano City, and 167 kilometers from central Tokyo. The 3000 meter Hida Mountains are to the west of the city, with 3190 meter Mount Hotakadake on the border of Matsumoto with Takayama, Gifu as the highest point within the city limits.

Surrounding municipalities
Nagano Prefecture
Okaya
Shiojiri
Azumino
Yamagata
Asahi
Ōmachi
Chikuhoku
Ueda
Nagawa
Aoki
Shimosuwa
Kiso-mura
Kiso-machi
Gifu Prefecture
Takayama

Climate
Matsumoto has a humid continental climate (Köppen climate classification: Dfa) bordering on a humid subtropical climate (Köppen climate classification: Cfa), with hot summers and cold winters. Precipitation is quite high in summer, but the weather is somewhat drier in winter.

History
Matsumoto is located in the former Shinano Province and was the provincial capital from the Heian period onwards. The area developed as the castle town of Matsumoto Domain under the Tokugawa shogunate of the Edo period. Modern Matsumoto Town was established with the creation of the municipalities system on April 1, 1889. It was raised to city status on May 1, 1907.

On February 1, 1925, Matsumoto absorbed the village of Matsumoto (from Higashichikuma District).

The city expanded further by annexing  the Kanda hamlet of the village of Nakayama from Higashichikuma District on April 1, 1943, the villages of Nakayama, Shimadachi and Shimauchi (all from Higashichikuma District) on April 1, 1954, the villages of Wada, Niimura, Kanbayashi, Sasaga, Yoshikawa, Kotobuki, Okada, Iriyamabe, Satoyamabe and Imai (all from Higashichikuma District) on August 1, 1954. Kitauchida and Gakenoyu hamlets were annexed from the Minamiuchida ward of the village of Kataoka in the city of Shiojiri on April 1, 1960 and April 1, 1961. The village of Hongo (from Higashichikuma District) on May 1, 1974 and parts of Seba hamlet (the hamlet of Kukohigashi) were annexed from Shiojiri on April 1, 1982.
 
Between the days of June 27 and June 28, 1994, the Matsumoto Incident sarin gas attack occurred.

Matsumoto was proclaimed a special city with increased local autonomy on November 1, 2000. Matsumoto annexed the villages of Azumi, Azusagawa and Nagawa (all from Minamiazumi District), and the village of Shiga (from Higashichikuma District) on April 1, 2005. This was followed by the town of Hata (from Higashichikuma District,) on March 31, 2010. Matsumoto was proclaimed a core city with increased local autonomy on April 1, 2021.

Demographics
Per Japanese census data, the population of Matsumoto has recently plateaued after a long period of growth.

Government
Matsumoto has a mayor-council form of government with a directly elected mayor and a unicameral city legislature of 31 members. The city contributes six members to the Nagano Prefectural Assembly.  In terms of national politics, Matsumoto is grouped with Ōmachi, Azumino, Higashichikuma District, Nagano, Kitaazumi District, Nagano, Kamiminochi District, Nagano and part of the city of Nagano to form Nagano 2nd District  in the lower house of the National Diet.

List of Matsumoto Mayors (since 1937) 

Yorinaga Ori (小里頼永) July 1937 to August 1937
Okimasa Momose (百瀬興政) August 1937 to April 1939
Wataru Momose (百瀬　渡) April 1940 to April 1944
Morito Hirabayashi (平林盛人) May 1944 to March 1945
Yasushi Hirayama (平山　泰) July 1945 to March 1946
Ikuichi Akahane (赤羽幾一) June 1946 to December 1946
Naohisa Tsutsui (筒井直久) April 1947 to April 1951
Bunshichiro Matsuoka(松岡文七郎) April 1951 to January 1957
Tokuya Furuhata (降旗徳弥) March 1957 to March 1969
Matsumi Fukasawa (深沢松美) March 1969 to March 1976
Shoji Wago (和合正治) March 1976 to March 1992
Tadashi Aruga (有賀　正) March 1992 to March 2004
Akira Sugenoya (菅谷 昭) March 2004 to March 2020
Yoshinao Gaun (臥雲義尚) March 2020 to present

Economy
Matsumoto is a regional commercial center and noted for traditional woodworking and silk spinning, electronics and its dairy industry. Seasonal tourism to the surrounding mountains and onsen hot spring resorts is also an important source of local income.

Education

Universities and colleges
Shinshu University
Matsumoto University
Matsusho Gakuen Junior College
Matsumoto Junior College

Primary and secondary education
Matsumoto has 29 public elementary schools operated by the city government, one operated by the national government and one private elementary school. The city also manages 19 public middle schools, with one more middle school shared between Matsumoto and neighbouring Asahi. There is one public middle school operated by the national government and one private middle school. The city has seven public high schools operated by the Nagano Prefectural Board of Education and six private high schools.  The city also has a Korean school, .

Transportation

Airport
Matsumoto Airport

Railway
 East Japan Railway Company –  Shinonoi Line
  –  –  – 
 East Japan Railway Company –  Ōito Line
  –  –  – 
Alpico Kōtsū – Kamikōchi Line
  –  –  –  –  –  –  –  –  –  –   –  –  –

Highway
 Nagano Expressway

Sister city relations

Domestic
Fujisawa, Kanagawa, from July 29, 1961
Himeji, Hyōgo, from November 17, 1966
Takayama, Gifu, from November 1, 1971

International
  Salt Lake City, Utah, United States, from 1958
   Kathmandu, Nepal, from November 17, 1989
  Langfang, Hebei, China, friendship city from March 21, 1995
  Grindelwald, Canton of Bern, Switzerland, from April 20, 1972

Local attractions
Matsumoto is attractive to travelers not only because of its traditional culture but also its moderate climate and local products. Matsumoto soba is famous for its delicate taste. Local attractions include:
Matsumoto Castle, built more than 400 years ago. It is a Japanese National Treasure
Kaichi School Museum, Meiji period building housing the first middle school in Japan
Asama Onsen
Kōbōyama Kofun, Kofun period burial mound, a National Historic Site
Hayashi Castle, Sengoku period castle ruins, a National Historic Site
Saito Kinen Festival Matsumoto, held every August by conductor Seiji Ozawa and featuring the Saito Kinen Orchestra
Kamikōchi mountain area
The Kiso Valley, a valley located Southwest of Matsumoto along which the historic Nakasendo route of the Edo period went through

Outside the rail station is also a statue of a little girl with a violin, remembering the Suzuki method of teaching music, created by Shinichi Suzuki who lived in the city in his later life.

Sports
Matsumoto is represented in the J. League of football with its local club, Matsumoto Yamaga FC based at the Alwin Stadium in Kambayashi.

It was one of the host cities of the official Women's Volleyball World Championship for its 1998 and 2010 editions.

Yoshinori Ueda was born here.

In popular culture
 – series of television dramas starting in 1996.
Orange – manga series written by Ichigo Takano
Perfect World – manga series written by Rie Aruga

Gallery

References

External links

Official Website 
Matsumoto City Tourism Website 

 
Cities in Nagano Prefecture